Bobby Beaton (born 14 May 1952) is a former international speedway rider from Scotland.

Speedway career 
Beaton rode in the top tier of British Speedway from 1968 to 1985, riding for various clubs. He reached the final of the British Speedway Championship in 1980.

Family
His younger brother Jim Beaton was a speedway rider and his older brother George Beaton was a junior rider before he was killed in a car crash in 1972. His father Jimmy Beaton Sr. was a promoter at Glasgow Tigers.

References 

1952 births
British speedway riders
Scottish speedway riders
Belle Vue Aces riders
Edinburgh Monarchs riders
Glasgow Tigers riders
Hull Vikings riders
Newcastle Diamonds riders
People from Blantyre, South Lanarkshire
Living people